The Tomb of Anedjib (Tomb X) is in Abydos, Egypt, in the Umm el-Qa'ab necropolis. Anedjib was a ruler of the First Dynasty of Egypt, who reigned around 2900 BC.

To date, the tomb has only been excavated once, by Flinders Petrie between 1899 and 1900. This is unlike the other tombs in the necropolis, which were excavated before Petrie by the Frenchman Émile Amélineau and subsequently by the German Archaeological Institute.

The tomb is relatively small. There is a burial chamber (7 x 4.5 metres), consisting of two rooms and is accessed by a stairway from the east. The walls of the chamber are more than a metre thick. The smaller of the two chambers contained several cylinder seals and was probably a storage chamber. The burial chamber was made of wooden planks set in the desert sand without any other foundations. Some of these planks were well-preserved. The roof of the chamber was held up by wooden posts, one of which was found still intact by the excavators.

Sixty-five chambers are grouped around the tomb, most of which should be interpreted as ancillary burials, though one of them was probably a storage chamber. Some of the chambers contained large numbers of ivory carvings.

Bibliography 
 Eva-Maria Engel. "The Royal Tombs at Umm el-Qa'ab," In: Archeo-Nil 18 (2008), p. 39.
 William Matthew Flinders Petrie. The royal tombs of the first dynasty: 1900. Part I (= Memoir of the Egypt Exploration Fund. Volume 18). Egypt Exploration Fund, London 1900, Digitised, pp. 12–13.

References 

First Dynasty of Egypt
Tombs of ancient Egypt
Abydos, Egypt sites